37signals (formerly Basecamp before reverting to its original name) is an American web software company based in Chicago, Illinois. The firm was cofounded in 1999 by Jason Fried, Carlos Segura, and Ernest Kim as a web design company.

Since mid2004, the company's focus has shifted from web design to web application development. Its first commercial application was Basecamp, followed by Backpack, Campfire, and Highrise. The open source web application framework Ruby on Rails was initially created for internal use at 37signals, before being publicly released in 2004.

In February 2014, the company adopted a new strategy, focusing entirely on its flagship product, the software package also named Basecamp, and renaming the company from 37signals to Basecamp. Jason Fried and David Heinemeier Hansson have published several books under the 37signals name, and in May 2022, citing their present-day focus on both Basecamp and HEY, reverted to 37signals as their company name.

History

The company 37signals was originally named after the 37 extraterrestrial radio signals identified by astronomer Paul Horowitz as potential messages from extraterrestrial intelligence. Work on the company's first product, the project management application Basecamp, began in 2003.

By 2005, the company had moved away from consulting work to focus exclusively on its own web applications. The Ruby on Rails web application framework was extracted from the work on Basecamp and released as open source. In 2006, the company announced that Jeff Bezos had acquired a minority stake via his personal investment company, Bezos Expeditions. The same year, Jason Fried, 37signals CEO, was included among MIT Technology Review's TR35 honoring technologists and scientists under the age of 35 for their ground-breaking inventions and research.

In 2014, 37signals changed its name to Basecamp and chose to focus solely on that product. As of August 2018, the Highrise product also stopped accepting new signups.

In September 2019, Basecamp gained some notoriety for purchasing Google Ads in the name of their own company because other organizations bought the keyword "Basecamp", causing four competitors to appear above Basecamp's own website in search results. Jason Fried called Google's search result policy a "shakedown". A Google spokesperson responded that competitors are not allowed to use trademarked names in their keywords if the owner of the trademark files a complaint with Google. Since the story broke, Google has stopped competitors from using the Basecamp trademark.

After Apple threatened to pull the service's iOS app, Hey, from the App Store, in September 2020, Basecamp signed up to help launch the Coalition for App Fairness to fight Apple's app store policies and "create a level playing field" for businesses.

In early 2021, employees raised concerns over the company's collection of "funny" customer names, with the Asian and African names on the list making some feel uncomfortable. Many found the list at odds with the company's stance on inclusion and diversity. In an internal company chat, an employee cited the Anti-Defamation League's "Pyramid of Hate." That April, Basecamp responded by announcing several changes to its policies, such as forbidding "societal and political discussions" in internal forums, which CEO Fried described as "a major distraction." The company offered severance packages to employees who disagreed with the changes.

Internally, employees continued to press on the topic. One employee argued this was an important issue given the rise in violence against Asians. Hansson responded by surfacing an old chat log that showed the employee participating in a conversation about funny customer names. Employees were taken aback by Hansson sharing the chat with the entire company. Two employees filed complaints with Human Resources, who declined to take action.

Escalating tensions resulted in an all-hands Zoom the following week. While management intended for the meeting to defuse the situation, the conversation turned confrontational, ending in the suspension of Basecamp's longtime head of strategy, who resigned the following day. Following the events, one third of the company resigned.

Products

Basecamp 
Basecamp is 37signals' first product, a web-based project management tool launched in 2004. Its primary features are to-do lists, milestone management, forum-like messaging, file sharing, and time tracking.

Basecamp Next was released in 2012, while Basecamp 3 was released in 2014. Basecamp 3 supports replies by email, but does not support bottom-posting.

Campfire 
Campfire, a business-oriented online chat service, launched in 2006. It was later merged into Basecamp 3, and was discontinued as a standalone service in 2013.

Highrise 
Highrise is a customer relationship management (CRM) product developed by 37signals and launched in 2007. Highrise was spun off as its own company in 2014 and operated as an independent business headed by Nathan Kontny, with 37signals retaining ownership.  In 2018 37signals (under the new Basecamp brand) brought Highrise back in-house, and closed it for new sign ups later that year. The product remains in use by a number of companies.

Ruby on Rails

Ruby on Rails is a free web application framework created by David Heinemeier Hansson, now a partner at Basecamp. It was originally used to make 37signals' first product, Basecamp, and was then extracted and released as open source in 2004.

Hey 

Hey (stylized in all-caps as HEY) is a premium email service started in June 2020 by Basecamp. A few days after its release, Apple gave notice to Basecamp to create an in-app subscription option for Hey, threatening to pull the service's iOS app from the App Store.

Works
Jason Fried and David Heinemeier Hansson published several books under the 37signals name.

 Defensive Design for the Web: How to improve error messages, help, forms, and other crisis points, New Riders Press, 2004 
 Getting Real: The Smarter, Faster, Easier Way to Build a Successful Web Application, 37signals, 2006, 
 Rework (2010, RandomHouse)  became a New York Times best seller. 
 Remote: Office Not Required (2013, RandomHouse), which is about allowing employees to work from remote offices, was also a New York Times best seller. The book was about 37signals' experience with a largely remote workforce.
 It Doesn't Have to Be Crazy at Work, October 2, 2018,

References

External links

 

Remote companies
Privately held companies based in Illinois
Companies based in Chicago
Software companies established in 1999
1999 establishments in Illinois
Project management software